The Patuleia, Guerra da Patuleia, or Little Civil War was a civil war in Portugal, so called to distinguish it from the 'great' civil war between Dom Pedro and Dom Miguel that ended in 1834. The Patuleia occurred after the Revolution of Maria da Fonte, and was closely associated with her.  It was caused by the nomination, as a result of the palace coup of 6 October 1846, known as the "Emboscada", to set up a clearly Cartista government presided over by marshal João Oliveira e Daun, Duque de Saldanha.

The war lasted 8 months, pitting the Cartistas (with the support of queen Maria II) against an unnatural coalition of Septembrists and Miguelists. The focus of resistance to the new government was the Septembrist 'Junta of Porto', whose military leader, the First Count of Bonfim, was defeated by Marshal Saldanha at the siege of Torres Vedras on 22–23 December 1846, and sent into exile in Angola. The war ended in a clear Cartista victory, as shown in the signing of the  resulting Convention of Gramido on 30 June 1847, but only just, after the intervention of foreign military forces of the Quadruple Alliance.

1846 in Portugal
Wars involving Portugal
Civil wars involving the states and peoples of Europe
Civil wars of the Industrial era
Revolution-based civil wars
Conflicts in 1846
1847 in Portugal